As Time Goes By is the tenth studio album by English singer Bryan Ferry, first released in Japan on 14 October 1999 and then in the UK on 25 October by Virgin Records. Consisting of cover versions of popular songs and jazz standards, the album was co-produced by Ferry with Rhett Davies, who had worked with Ferry since his days with Roxy Music. It peaked at number 16 on the UK Albums Chart and has been certified Gold by the British Phonographic Industry (BPI), denoting shipments in excess of 100,000 copies.

Critical reception
Stephen Thomas Erlewine of AllMusic wrote of the album: "On the surface, it may seem like a departure for Ferry, but in the end, it's entirely of a piece with his body of work. True, it may not be a major album in the scheme of things, but it's easy to be seduced by its casual elegance." Keith Phipps of The A.V. Club commented that "the results are both predictable and thrilling, musically tasteful but as emotionally raw as good manners will allow."

Track listing

Personnel

Musicians

 Bryan Ferry – lead vocals, synthesizers (4), arrangements
 Colin Good – grand piano (1-14), synthesizers (4), harmonium (11), musical director, arrangements
 Cynthia Millar – Ondes Martenot (1, 4, 5, 8, 15)
 James Sanger – programming (4)
 José Libertella – bandoneon (4, 13)
 Luis Stazo – bandoneon (4, 13)
 Nils Solberg – guitars (1-4, 6, 9, 10, 12, 15)
 Phil Manzanera – guitars (4)
 Martin Wheatley – banjo (7, 14), guitars (13)
 Richard Jeffries – bass (1–3, 6, 7, 9, 10, 12–14)
 Chris Laurence – bass (4, 5, 11, 15)
 John Sutton – drums (1–3, 7, 9, 10, 12–14)
 Andy Newmark – drums (4)
 Paul Clarvis – drums (6)
 Frank Ricotti – percussion (4, 14)
 Tobias Tak – tap dance (6)
 Anthony Pleeth – cello (1, 5, 8, 11, 13–15)
 Hugh Webb – harp (1, 5, 11, 15)
 Philip Dukes – viola (1, 5, 11)
 Peter Lale – viola (13, 14, 15)
 David Woodcock – violin (1, 5, 11)
 Gavyn Wright – violin (1, 5, 11, 13–15)
 Abraham Leborovich – violin (4), violin solo (13)
 Boguslaw Kostecki – violin (13, 14)
 Wilfred Gibson – violin (15)
 Alan Barnes – clarinet (2, 3, 6, 7, 12, 14), tenor saxophone (2, 3, 6, 7, 9, 10, 12), alto saxophone (10, 14)
 Jim Tomlinson – clarinet (3, 6, 12), alto saxophone (3, 6, 9, 12)
 Robert Fowler – clarinet (7, 14), tenor saxophone (9, 10, 14)
 Anthony Pike – bass clarinet (15)
 Nicholas Bucknail – clarinet (15)
 Timothy Lines – clarinet (15)
 David White – clarinet (15)
 Malcolm Earle Smith – trombone (2, 3, 6, 9, 10, 12)
 Bob Hunt – trombone (7, 14)
 Enrico Tomasso – trumpet (2, 3, 6, 7, 9, 10, 12, 14)
 Alice Retif – poem reading (4)
 The Oxford Girls Choir – choir (7)

Technical
 Bryan Ferry – producer
 Rhett Davies – producer
 Robin Trower – associate producer (6, 15)
 Mark Tucker – engineer
 Steve Pelluet – assistant engineer
 Chris Dibble – additional engineer
 Sven Taits – additional engineer
 Simon Puxley – engineer consultant
 Bob Ludwig – mastering at Gateway Mastering (Portland, Maine)
 Nicole Blumberg – production coordinator
 Juliet Mann – production coordinator

Artwork
 Nick de Ville – art direction
 Bryan Ferry – art direction
 Bogdan Zarkowski – artwork
 Mike Owen – photography

Charts

Certifications

References

1999 albums
Albums produced by Rhett Davies
Bryan Ferry albums
Covers albums
Traditional pop albums
Virgin Records albums